Harold Cawthorne (born 1900) was a professional footballer, who played for Huddersfield Town & Sheffield United.

Honours
Huddersfield Town
 First Division (2): 1923–24, 1925–26

References

1900 births
Year of death missing
Footballers from Sheffield
English footballers
Association football defenders
English Football League players
Huddersfield Town A.F.C. players
Sheffield United F.C. players